Mays Point is a hamlet in the Town of Tyre, Seneca County, New York, United States, near the Wayne and Cayuga county lines. The primary intersection in the hamlet is at N.Y. Route 89 and Mays Point Road (CR 105A). Mays Point is situated along the Erie Canal near the junction of the Seneca and Clyde rivers within the Montezuma Marsh. The New York State Thruway (Interstate 90) passes just south of the hamlet.

Erie Canal Lock 25 is located off Mays Point Road, near N.Y. Route 89.

References

Hamlets in Seneca County, New York
Hamlets in New York (state)